Hackett Tower, also known as Anadarko Tower II, is a 31-story  skyscraper located in The Woodlands, Texas. It is currently the second tallest building in Montgomery County, Texas, after Allison Tower. It is certified under the U.S. Green Building Council's Leadership in Energy and Environmental Design program.

Overview
Following the construction of Allison Tower in 2002 and the growth of Anadarko Petroleum, construction of Hackett Tower began in 2012 to house up to 1,700 employees and staff. The tower is named after James Hackett, the first CEO of Anadarko. Hackett Tower contains a full-service dining area and coffee bar. The building includes its own conference floor with dozens of meeting rooms in a variety of sizes. The fitness center features a basketball court, fully equipped gym and locker rooms. In addition, outdoor green space is included on the more than 7 acres of land on which the tower is located.

References

External links
Hackett Tower

Skyscrapers in Texas
Skyscraper office buildings in Texas
Office buildings completed in 2014
Gensler buildings